Code page 1102 (CCSID 1102), also known as CP1102 or NL7DEC, is an IBM code page number assigned to the Dutch variant of DEC's National Replacement Character Set (NRCS). The 7-bit character set was introduced for DEC's computer terminal systems, starting with the VT200 series in 1983, but is also used by IBM for their DEC emulation. It is called DUTCH by Kermit.

Although NL7DEC complies with the ISO 646 invariant layout (and is hence a close derivation from ASCII, with only nine code points differing), it is not ISO646-NL, which is otherwise unrelated (Code page 1019).

Code page layout

See also
National Replacement Character Set (NRCS)
Code page 1019

References

1102
Dutch language